No. 357 Squadron was a special operations squadron of the Royal Air Force. During the Second World War it was involved in supplying Allied ground forces operating behind enemy lines, in the South-East Asian theatre.

History
The squadron was formed on 1 February 1944 at Digri, Bengal, from No. 1576 (Special Duties) Flight as an expansion of the Royal Air Force Special Duty Service. The squadron was equipped with Consolidated Liberator and Lockheed Hudson aircraft, which formed "A" Flight, whilst "B" Flight consisted of four Consolidated Catalina aircraft operated by the squadron from Red Hills Lake, Madras. The Catalina flight became No. 628 Squadron on 21 March 1944. On 15 September 1944, No. 357 Squadron moved to Jessore, Bengal. Operational flights dropping small numbers of agents and equipment into Malaya began in November 1944 using the squadrons Liberators. The flights in early 1945 were to locations in Kelatan and Perak. Later flights were reaching as far south as Batu Pahat and Kota Tinggi and covering 3,500 air miles with a flying times of over 22 hours - near the aircraft's maximum range.

Also early in 1945, the Hudsons were replaced by Douglas Dakotas, and "C" Flight was equipped with Westland Lysanders joined the squadron. The squadron disbanded on 15 November 1945.

Aircraft operated

Squadron bases

Commanding officers

References

Citations

Bibliography

External links
 No.357 Squadron history
 Video Interview with a 357 Squadron Engineer

357 Squadron
Military units and formations established in 1944
Aircraft squadrons of the Royal Air Force in World War II
Military units and formations of Ceylon in World War II
Military units and formations disestablished in 1945